Franz Kürner (3 December 1889 – 3 March 1960) was an Austrian footballer. He played in two matches for the Austria national football team in 1915.

References

External links
 

1889 births
1960 deaths
Austrian footballers
Austria international footballers
Place of birth missing
Association footballers not categorized by position